Careful, He Might Hear You may refer to:
 Careful, He Might Hear You (novel), a 1963 novel by Sumner Locke Elliott
 Careful, He Might Hear You (film), a 1983 Australian drama film, based on the novel